German submarine U-634 was a Type VIIC U-boat built for Nazi Germany's Kriegsmarine for service during World War II.
She was laid down on 23 September 1941 by Blohm & Voss, Hamburg as yard number 610, launched on 10 June 1942 and commissioned on 6 August 1942 under Oberleutnant zur See Hans-Günther Brosin.

Design
German Type VIIC submarines were preceded by the shorter Type VIIB submarines. U-634 had a displacement of  when at the surface and  while submerged. She had two shafts and two  propellers.

U-634 was fitted with five  torpedo tubes (four fitted at the bow and one at the stern), fourteen torpedoes, one  SK C/35 naval gun, 220 rounds, and one twin  C/30 anti-aircraft gun. The boat had a complement of between forty-four and sixty.

Service history
The boat's career began with training at 5th U-boat Flotilla on 6 August 1942, followed by active service on 1 February 1943 as part of the 9th Flotilla for the remainder of her service.

Fate
All crew members died.

Wolfpacks
U-634 took part in five wolfpacks, namely:
 Westmark (6 – 11 March 1943)
 Amsel (22 April – 3 May 1943)
 Amsel 2 (3 – 6 May 1943)
 Elbe (7 – 10 May 1943)
 Elbe 1 (10 – 14 May 1943)

Summary of raiding history

References

Bibliography

External links

German Type VIIC submarines
1942 ships
U-boats commissioned in 1942
Ships lost with all hands
U-boats sunk in 1943
U-boats sunk by depth charges
U-boats sunk by British warships
World War II shipwrecks in the Atlantic Ocean
World War II submarines of Germany
Ships built in Hamburg
U-boat accidents
Maritime incidents in August 1943